Tropical Storm Dottie was the ninth tropical cyclone and fourth named storm of the 1976 Atlantic hurricane season. The precursor to Dottie formed in the Gulf of Mexico on August 17 and organized into a tropical depression on August 18. The storm drifted towards the east, and, after peaking as a moderate tropical storm, it accelerated northeastward and made landfall on Florida. Upon re-emerging in the Atlantic, Dottie turned northward and moved ashore near Charleston, South Carolina. Damage from the storm was primarily insignificant and limited to gusty winds, heavy rainfall, and high tides; however, a fishing boat capsized in the Bahamas, resulting in the deaths of four people.

Meteorological history

The center of the disturbance soon began to consolidate while barometric pressure fell 8 mbar in 24 hours; it was declared a tropical depression at 0000 UTC on August 18. The depression drifted east and northeastward over the next day, though it began to accelerate on August 19. The cyclone further intensified to tropical storm status by 1200 UTC. Operationally, however, it was not named until later that day.

Having made landfall in southwestern Florida, Dottie quickly proceeded northeastward before re-emerging into the Atlantic Ocean. High pressure building to the north of the storm indicated it would turn more towards the west, but it moved nearly due northward. The cyclone attained its peak intensity with winds of 50 mph (85 km/h) at 0600 UTC on August 20 and subsequently began to weaken; by the time Dottie made landfall in Charleston, South Carolina later that evening, it was barely of tropical storm intensity. It deteriorated into a tropical depression on August 21 and dissipated shortly thereafter. The remnant low pressure system turned southward and once again entered the Atlantic before turning westward and crossing the Florida peninsula.

Preparations and impact

In response to the storm, gale warnings were issued on August 19 from Jacksonville, Florida to Virginia Beach, Virginia. A hurricane watch was also posted between Savannah, Georgia and Cape Hatteras, North Carolina. The hurricane watch was later extended to Jacksonville when conditions appeared more favorable for the storm's intensification, but was soon discontinued. Flooding rains were anticipated in the Carolinas, though, in contrast, Dottie was compared to a mere thunderstorm by some local officials.

Prior to being upgraded to a tropical storm, the depression spawned heavy precipitation and high winds throughout southern Florida and portions of the Bahamas. In Fort Lauderdale, the storm dropped  of rainfall, and in the Miami area, 24-hour rainfall totals reached . The heavy rainfall caused street flooding across the region, especially in the Broward County cities of Fort Lauderdale, Hollywood, Lauderhill, Miramar, and Tamarac. Further south, street flooding in Miami delayed thousands of motorists during morning rush-hour traffic. The winds downed trees, and left roughly 20 neighborhoods in southern Florida without power during the passage of Dottie. Near the latter location, a fishing boat capsized during the storm; four of its occupants drowned. 

Overall damage was light and primarily limited to coastal beach erosion. In some areas, Dottie helped relieve drought conditions.

References

External links
Tropical Storm Dottie preliminary report
Tropical Storm Dottie rainfall information

Dottie
Dottie (1976)
Dottie (1976)
Dottie (1976)
Dottie (1976)